Plamen P. Angelov  is a computer scientist. He is a professor and chair in Intelligent Systems and Director of Research at the School of Computing and Communications of Lancaster University, Lancaster, United Kingdom. He is founding Director of the Lancaster Intelligent, Robotic and Autonomous systems (LIRA) research centre. Angelov was Vice President of the International Neural Networks Society  (serving two consecutive terms, 2017-2020) of which he is now Governor-at-large. He is the founder of the Intelligent Systems Research group and the Data Science group at the School of Computing and Communications.
Prof. Angelov was named Fellow of the Institute of Electrical and Electronics Engineers (IEEE) in 2016 for contributions to neuro-fuzzy and autonomous learning systems. He is also a Fellow of ELLIS  and the IET.
Dr. Angelov is a founding co-Editor-in-chief of the Evolving Systems journal since 2009 as well as associate editor of the IEEE Transactions on Cybernetics, IEEE Transactions on Fuzzy Systems, IEEE Transactions on AI, Complex and Intelligent Systems and other scientific journals. He is recipient of the 2020 Dennis Gabor Award  as well as IEEE and INNS awards for Outstanding Contributions (2013, 2017), The Engineer 2008 special award and others. Author of over 350 publications including 3 research monographs (by Springer, 2002; Wiley, 2012 and Springer Nature, 2012), 3 granted US patents, over 100 articles in peer reviewed scientific journals, over 150 papers in peer reviewed conference proceedings, etc.

References

External links

20th-century births
Living people
Bulgarian engineers
Academics of Lancaster University
Fellow Members of the IEEE
Year of birth missing (living people)
Place of birth missing (living people)